Mae Valley may refer to:

Maè Valley, valley of the Maè River near Longarone, Italy 
Mae Valley Rd, Interstate 90 in Washington
Mae Valley (band)
Mae Valley (EP)